= Tahindesar =

Village in Rajasthan, India

- village
- Location in Rajasthan, India Tahindesar (India)
- Coordinates: 27°42′0″N 73°58′0″E
- Country: India
- State: Rajasthan

Languages
  - Official: Hindi
- Time zone: UTC+5:30 (IST)

Tehandesar is a small populated place in the province of Rajasthan, India.
